Harold "Hal" Miller is an American actor, comedian, painter, singer, lyricist and poet. He was the second actor to play Gordon Robinson on Sesame Street from 1972 to 1974, succeeding Matt Robinson.

Early life

Miller lived most of his early life in Harlem, New York. He was raised a Catholic with early education in parochial school and a final degree in chemistry, assisting in research with chemist Dr. Casimir Funk, an early discoverer of vitamins who helped coin the word "vitamin" in Paris in 1911. Before pursuing a career as an actor, Miller worked with Funk and was published with him in Federation Proceedings Vol. 22 No. 2 (Abstracts) in the 1960s at the Funk Foundation for Medical Research sponsored by Pfizer in New York.

Career

Miller began acting when he was 18 years old with the Stanley Woolf players on the Borscht circuit in Liberty, New York, performing Take a Giant Step and serving as company manager. He followed this by appearing in plays in his native Harlem. Miller went on to perform as Lord Ross at the American Shakespeare Festival in Stratford, Connecticut, then as Fabian in Twelfth Night at the Vivian Beaumont Theater at Lincoln Center for the Performing Arts. He moved to Hollywood to co-star in Joe Forrester and Quinn Martin, as well as LA Underground Quest for Columbia Pictures. He returned to New York City to star as Purge in NBC Sunday special Purge's Place with Jim Patterson, and then as the lead David in Stone in the River. Roxie Roker played his wife; also appearing in this production were Hugh Hurd and James MacMillan. For NBC director Martin Hoade Miller next appeared in a production of Jean Genet's The Blacks before traveling to China for filmwork and subsequently to India to work in Bollywood with director Nileish Malhotha.

Miller received his Actors' Equity Association card in 1966 while working with Joseph Papp in Henry V and his Screen Actors Guild card in 1971 after being hired by Columbia Pictures. He appeared in the Lizzie Borden film Born in Flames and also in A Man Called Adam, as well as a Quinn Martin production in San Francisco. In 1968 he was invited to perform experimental, integrated theater for one season at Arena Stage in Washington, D.C. From 1972 until 1974, Miller played Gordon on Sesame Street. Miller made the decision to leave the show for mainstream acting. He followed this direction making two major appearances on Law & Order. Miller performed extensively throughout Europe, China, and India. In 1996, Miller retired from acting.

Personal life
Miller was married to interior designer Lynne Miller. Their son Harold Miller Jr. appeared on Sesame Street with his dad during the 1970s. In addition to acting, Miller is also a painter (represented by Saatchi), a singer, a lyricist, and a published poet.

Selected filmography

Film

Television

References

External links

 

American male comedians
21st-century American comedians
American male television actors
African-American male actors
People from Harlem

20th-century American comedians
20th-century African-American people
21st-century African-American people